Firewalls and Internet Security: Repelling the Wily Hacker is a 1994 book by William R. Cheswick and Steven M. Bellovin that helped define the concept of a network firewall.
Describing in detail one of the first major firewall deployments at AT&T, the book influenced the formation of the perimeter security model, which became the dominant network security architecture in the mid-1990s.

In 2003, a second edition was published, adding Aviel D. Rubin to its authors.

References

External links
Web page for the second edition
Firewalls and Internet Security at Google Books

Internet security
Computer security books
1994 non-fiction books
Books about the Internet
Works about security and surveillance
Works about computer hacking